is a multi-use stadium in Utsunomiya, Japan.  It is currently used mostly for baseball games, and the stadium holds approximately 30,000 people.

Baseball venues in Japan
Sports venues in Tochigi Prefecture